The 1932 United States presidential election in Arkansas was held on November 8, 1932, as part of the concurrent 1932 United States presidential election held throughout all forty-eight contemporary states. State voters chose nine electors, or representatives to the Electoral College, who voted for President and Vice-president.

Background
Except for the Unionist Ozark counties of Newton and Searcy where Republicans controlled local government, Arkansas since the end of Reconstruction had been a classic one-party Democratic “Solid South” state. Disfranchisement of effectively all African-Americans and most poor whites had meant that outside those two aberrant counties, the Republican Party was completely moribund and Democratic primaries the only competitive elections.

The 1920s did see a minor change in this, as increased voting by poor Ozark whites as a protest against Woodrow Wilson's internationalist foreign policy meant that Warren G. Harding was able to win almost forty percent of the statewide vote in 1920; however despite his national landslide Calvin Coolidge in 1924 could not do any more than win the two traditional Unionist GOP counties. 1928 saw the rest of the Outer South and North Alabama bolt the anti-Prohibition Catholic Al Smith, but the presence of Arkansas Senator Joseph Taylor Robinson as running mate meant that within Arkansas only the most northwesterly counties with ordinarily substantial Republican votes would suffer the same fate.

The following years saw Arkansas plunge into the Great Depression, followed almost immediately by a major drought from the summer of 1930s until the winter of 1931/1932. This came on top of a long depression in agriculture, which was still the dominant player in Arkansas’ economy and was backed up by the “Great Migration” of the state's agricultural labor force to northeastern and midwestern cities.

Vote
With the Depression not improving, Arkansas gave extremely heavy support to Democrat Franklin Roosevelt in the 1932 election. Roosevelt won every county in the state, becoming the first Democrat to win Searcy County since before the Civil War and only the second to win adjacent Newton County.

Results

Results by county

See also
 United States presidential elections in Arkansas

Notes

References

1932
Arkansas